These are the official results of the Men's Pole Vault event at the 1999 IAAF World Championships in Athletics in Seville, Spain. There were a total number of 34 participating athletes, with two qualifying groups and the final held on Thursday 26 August 1999 at 19:10h.

Medalists

Schedule
All times are Central European Time (UTC+1)

Records

Abbreviations
All results shown are in metres

Results

Qualification
Qualification: Qualifying Performance 5.75 (Q) or at least 12 best performers (q) advance to the final.

Final
26 August

References
 IAAF
 trackandfieldnews

H
Pole vault at the World Athletics Championships